Jean Worms (1884–1943) was a French film actor who appeared in a mixture of leading and supporting roles. Worms played Tsar Nicholas II of Russia in the 1938 film Rasputin.

Partial filmography

 L'auberge rouge (1910)
 48, avenue de l'Opéra (1917) - Quincy
 Le roi de la mer (1917)
 La marâtre (1918)
 Marion Delorme (1918) - Didier
 Lorsqu'une femme veut (1918)
 Le marchand de sable (1931) - Gérard Arnaudy
 Le marchand de sable (1932) - Le commandant Saint-Hallier
 Nights in Port Said (1932) - Le tenancier de l'agence
 Fantômas (1932) - Lord Beltham - le mari de Lady Beltham
 Narcotics (1932) - Louis Gordon
 The Orderly (1933) - Limousin
 Le voleur (1933) - Raymond Lagardes
 Le masque qui tombe (1933) - Admiral Morstan
 Volga in Flames (1934) - (uncredited)
 Gold in the Street (1934) - Le baron de Varville - un grand banquier
 Le billet de mille (1935) - L'aristocrate
 Antonia (1935) - Bela de Palmay
 La Garçonne (1936) - Lerbier
 L'argent (1936) - Daigremont
 Port Arthur (1936) - Commander Novitzki
 The Red Dancer (1937) - Maître Brégyl
 Gribouille (1937) - Le président
 Maman Colibri (1937) - Pierre de Rysbergue
 Abused Confidence (1938) - Le président du tribunal
 Rasputin (1938) - Tsar Nicholas II
 Adrienne Lecouvreur (1938) - Le duc de Chaumont
 Women's Prison (1938) - Max Régent
 La cité des lumières (1938)
 Three from St Cyr (1939) - Le commandant Lenoir
 Vidocq (1939) - Le préfet Henry
 Entente cordiale (1939) - Théophile Delcassé
 Law of the North (1939) - Un monsieur au bal de charité (uncredited)
 Brazza ou l'épopée du Congo (1940) - L'amiral de Montaignac
 Sarajevo (1940) - L'empereur François Joseph (avec)
 Une femme disparaît (1942) - Henri Chardin (final film role)

References

Bibliography
 Kennedy-Karpat, Colleen. Rogues, Romance, and Exoticism in French Cinema of the 1930s. Fairleigh Dickinson, 2013.

External links

1884 births
1943 deaths
French male silent film actors
French male film actors
Male actors from Paris
20th-century French male actors